The 1968–69 season was Aberdeen's 56th season in the top flight of Scottish football and their 58th season overall. Aberdeen competed in the Scottish League Division One, Scottish League Cup, Scottish Cup and the Fairs Cup.

Results

Own goal scorers in italics

Division 1

Final standings

Scottish League Cup

Group 3

Group 3 final table

Scottish Cup

Inter-Cities Fairs Cup

References

AFC Heritage Trust

Aberdeen F.C. seasons
Aberdeen